The half-power point is the point at which the output power has dropped to half of its peak value; that is, at a level of approximately -3 dB. 

In filters, optical filters, and electronic amplifiers, the half-power point is also known as half-power bandwidth and is a commonly used definition for the cutoff frequency. 

In the characterization of antennas the half-power point is also known as half-power beamwidth and relates to measurement position as an angle and describes directionality.

Amplifiers and filters
A bandpass amplifier will have two half-power points, while a low-pass amplifier or a high-pass amplifier will have only one. 

The bandwidth of a filter or amplifier is usually defined as the difference between the lower and upper half-power points. This is, therefore, also known as the 3 dB bandwidth.  There is no lower half-power point for a low-pass amplifier, so the bandwidth is measured relative to DC, i.e., 0 Hz. There is no upper half-power point for an ideal high-pass amplifier, its bandwidth is theoretically infinite. In practice the stopband and transition band are used to characterize a high-pass.

Antenna beams

In antennas, the expression half-power point does not relate to frequency: instead, it describes the extent in space of an antenna beam.  The half-power point is the angle off boresight at which the antenna gain first falls to half power (approximately -3 dB) from the peak. The angle between the  points is known as the half-power beam width (or simply beam width).

Beamwidth is usually but not always expressed in degrees and for the horizontal plane.
It refers to the main lobe, when referenced to the peak effective radiated power of the main lobe.
Note that other definitions of beam width exist, such as the distance between nulls and distance between first side lobes.

Calculation
The beamwidth can be computed for arbitrary antenna arrays.

From the beam pattern , the antenna power is computed as:

The half-power beamwidth (HPBW) is then found as the range of  where .

See also 
 Antenna aperture
 Angular resolution
Full width at half maximum

Notes

References

Electronic amplifiers
Antennas (radio)